Sir John Baines Johnston  (13 May 1918 – 16 October 2005) was a British diplomat. He is best known for being Britain's High Commissioner to Rhodesia when that colony made its Unilateral Declaration of Independence in November 1965.

Early career 
Johnston was born at Maryport, Cumberland, the son of a Baptist clergyman, and was educated at Banbury Grammar School and The Queen's College, Oxford. He served with the Gordon Highlanders in the Second World War.

In 1947 Johnston joined the British Colonial Office, and three years later 
was sent to the Gold Coast (now Ghana) for 18 months before returning to 
London, where he was appointed principal private secretary to the Secretary 
of State for the Colonies, Oliver Lyttelton. His duties included working on 
the new Nigerian constitution and the future of the Federation of Rhodesia and Nyasaland.

In 1956–57, Johnston was head of the Far Eastern Department of the Colonial 
Office, concerned with delivering independence to Malaya and the future of 
Singapore. He then transferred to the Commonwealth Relations Office (CRO), 
where he was head of the Defence and Western Department before being 
appointed deputy high commissioner in South Africa in 1959.

In 1961 he was appointed High Commissioner in Sierra Leone, then in 1963 he was appointed High Commissioner to the Federation of Rhodesia and Nyasaland, which was dissolved on 31 December. He then became the high commissioner to (Southern) Rhodesia.

Rhodesia 
Johnston had to deal with what he described as "hardcore racialists" in the Rhodesian Front government (under Ian Smith), as well as with the African nationalists leaders Joshua Nkomo and the Rev Ndabaningi Sithole.

As far as Rhodesia was concerned, Johnston had to try to convince the Rhodesian Front that the British government could not allow independence without firm guarantees that the African population would make rapid progress to the management of their own affairs (whites made up only 7% of the population, but had control of the government). For a year he was the "middleman" as Britain and Rhodesia attempted to hammer out a constitutional basis for independence, with Britain insisting on eventual majority rule.

Johnston's view of Ian Smith (Rhodesia's prime minister), was uncompromising: "a dour, humourless man who could see no point of view but his own". But for a time Johnston believed that, if negotiations continued, the threat of UDI (Unilateral Declaration of Independence) might be averted.

So tense was the atmosphere in the Rhodesian capital, Salisbury, that 
Johnston found it impossible to establish relaxed friendships.  For his part, Smith found Johnston a "strange man" to deal with.

On 11 November 1965 Smith declared UDI, and Johnston was withdrawn the next day.

Career after UDI 
Johnston had a period as Assistant Under-Secretary at the Commonwealth 
Office, in charge of information services and relations with India and 
Pakistan; he was then Deputy Under-Secretary in charge of Africa during the 
time of the Nigerian Civil War.

In 1971 he was appointed High Commissioner in Malaysia, whose independence 
constitution he had helped to negotiate earlier in his career; he had also 
represented the British government at the independence celebrations.

His final posting was as High Commissioner in Canada (1974–78). 

From 1978 to 1985, he was a Governor of the BBC.

Honours
  :
Companion of the Order of St Michael and St George (CMG) (1962)
Knight Commander of the Order of St Michael and St George (KCMG) (1966)
Knight Commander of the Royal Victorian Order (KCVO) (1972) following The Queen's state visit to Malaysia
Knight Grand Cross of the Order of St Michael and St George (GCMG) (1978)

  :
Honorary Commander of the Order of the Defender of the Realm (P.M.N.) (1972)

References

1918 births
2005 deaths
Alumni of The Queen's College, Oxford
Gordon Highlanders officers
British Army personnel of World War II
Knights Commander of the Royal Victorian Order
Knights Grand Cross of the Order of St Michael and St George
High Commissioners of the United Kingdom to Sierra Leone
High Commissioners of the United Kingdom to Zimbabwe
High Commissioners of the United Kingdom to Malaysia
High Commissioners of the United Kingdom to Canada
People from Maryport
Civil servants in the Commonwealth Relations Office
Honorary Commanders of the Order of the Defender of the Realm